Government House is the official residence of the governor of Victoria, currently Linda Dessau. It is located in Kings Domain, Melbourne, next to the Royal Botanic Gardens.

Government House was opened in 1876, on land that had originally been set aside in 1841. Previous governors' residences included La Trobe's Cottage (1839–1854), Toorak House (1854–1874), and Bishopscourt (1874–1876). It was designed by William Wardell in the Italianate style, and modelled to some extent on Queen Victoria's Osborne House residence, to which it bears a strong resemblance. Between 1901 and 1930, Government House was used as the official residence of the Governor-General of Australia. This occurred during the period when Canberra was still under construction and Melbourne was designated as the temporary seat of government. Despite Parliament House opening in 1927, the Governor-General did not permanently move to Yarralumla for another three years, at which point Government House was given back to the Victorian government.

History
The land for Government House was set aside by Lieutenant-Governor of Victoria, Charles La Trobe,  in 1841. In 1857, Ferdinand von Mueller, Director of the Royal Botanic Gardens, landscaped the whole area, including Government House reserve, as one parkland. Construction of the building did not start until 1871 and was completed in 1876.

While La Trobe was Lieutenant-Governor he lived in La Trobe's Cottage. Between 1854 and 1874, Governors lived at Toorak House, then they lived in Bishopscourt in East Melbourne until the present Government House was occupied in 1876.

Between the formation of the Commonwealth of Australia in 1901 and 1927, Government House was the official residence of the Governor-General of Australia. When the Federal Parliament commenced sitting in Canberra in 1927, the Governor-General stayed at Government House, Canberra at Yarralumla while Parliament was in session, but also continued living at Government House in Melbourne until 1930. During this period Governors of Victoria lived at Stonington mansion. The House has been in continuous use by the Governors of Victoria since 1934.

Building design
Government House was designed by William Wardell, Inspector General of the Public Works Department, in the Victorian Period Italianate style, and is reminiscent of Queen Victoria's summer residence on the Isle of Wight, Osborne House. The building reflects the extravagant style of the period with a booming economy due to the Victorian gold rush.

The main building consists of three parts: the south wing with its extravagant single storey State Ballroom, a grand staircase hall entrance to the three storey State rooms and two storey vice-regal apartments to the north. Rising from the building is a 145-foot belvedere tower. The mews — a paved area surrounded on three sides by stables, coach houses and staff living quarters is nearby.

The garden was designed by John Sayce in 1873 and is thought to be the "most intact 19th century mansion garden remaining in Melbourne" by the Victorian Heritage Register. William Guilfoyle, curator of the Melbourne Botanic Gardens, further refined the original garden design with "many fine mature trees, including conifers, Australian rainforest species and deciduous trees, which are characteristic of the era and which also reflect Guilfoyle’s personal taste.".

See also
 William Wardell, Government House, Melbourne.
 Government House
 Governor of Victoria
 Governor-General of Australia
 Government Houses of Australia
 Government Houses in the Commonwealth

References

External links

Government House Victoria - Virtual Tour

Government buildings in Melbourne
Official residences in Australia
Melbourne
Government buildings completed in 1876
Houses in Melbourne
Houses completed in 1876
1876 establishments in Australia
Victoria State Government
Heritage-listed buildings in Melbourne
William Wardell buildings
British colonial architecture in Australia
Italianate architecture in Melbourne
Neoclassical architecture in Australia
Victorian architecture in Victoria (Australia)
Ballrooms in Australia
Governors' mansions
Landmarks in Melbourne
Buildings and structures in the City of Melbourne (LGA)